Air Ecosse was a Scottish commuter airline based in Aberdeen operating in the late 1970s to mid-1980s. They flew between Aberdeen and cities in northern England, such as Liverpool and Carlisle as well as to Edinburgh and Glasgow. They also carried out mail flights for the Royal Mail. The company's first scheduled flight was in June 1977, between Aberdeen and Wick. By 1985 the company had 165 employees.

History
The airline was formed in June 1977 as a subsidiary of Fairflight Charters based at Biggin Hill in Kent, England.
The airline started flights from Aberdeen to Dundee, Glasgow, Manchester, Wick and Sumburgh.

In the 1980s, the airline started flights to other destinations such as Edinburgh, Liverpool and Carlisle. The airline also started flights for the Royal Mail.

In November 1988 it was taken over by Peregrine Air Services Limited.

Aberdeen Airways

The new company became Aberdeen Airways (Callsign: Granite). Aberdeen Airways subsequently also filed for bankruptcy protection, moved to East Midlands (EMA) and finally ended operations.  After the airline's collapse, many staff moved to the new airline Malinair.

Destinations 

Denmark
Esbjerg Airport

England
Barrow/Walney Island Airport
Blackpool Airport
Carlisle Airport
Durham Tees Valley
East Midlands airport
Gatwick Airport
Heathrow Airport
Humberside Airport
Leeds Bradford Airport
Liverpool Airport
Manchester Airport
Norwich Airport

Faroe Islands
Vagar Airport

Northern Ireland
Belfast International Airport

Scotland
Aberdeen Airport
Dundee Airport
Edinburgh Airport
Glasgow Airport
Prestwick Airport
Sumburgh Airport
Wick Airport

The Republic of Ireland
Cork Airport
Dublin Airport
Shannon Airport

Fleet 
Air Ecosse had the following aircraft in their fleet at the time that operations ceased;

 Britten-Norman Trislander
 DHC-6 Twin Otter
 Embraer EMB-110 Bandeirante
 Handley Page HPR-7 Herald 209
 Short 330-200
 Short 360

See also
 List of defunct airlines of the United Kingdom

References 

Defunct airlines of Scotland
Companies based in Aberdeen